Ovidijus Varanauskas (born February 23, 1991) is a professional Lithuanian basketball player for Saint-Vallier Basket Drôme of the LNB Pro B. He plays the point guard position.

International career
Varanauskas previously represented the Lithuanian youth squads and won bronze medal with the Lithuanian U-16 Team in 2007 FIBA Europe Under-16 Championship.

3x3 
Varanauskas made his 3x3 debut in 2013 at the FIBA 3x3 World Tour Prague Masters, representing the city of Vilnius and finishing 6th.

One year later, Varanauskas was called up to represent Lithuania at the FIBA 3x3 World Championships in Moscow , Russia, and led the team to the semi-finals. He collected bronze three months later at the FIBA 3x3 European Championships in Bucharest, Romania.

In 2015, Varanauskas made another national team appearance at the first-ever  and reached 6th place. In the 3x3 professional circuit, he had a masterful performance at the Lausanne Masters, leading Team Vilnius to the win and getting MVP honours.  His squad finished 11th at the FIBA 3x3 World Tour Final in Abu Dhabi, UAE.

References

1991 births
Living people
Basketball players at the 2015 European Games
BC Juventus players
BC Prienai players
BC Statyba players
BK Valmiera players
European Games competitors for Lithuania
Limoges CSP players
Lithuanian men's basketball players
Pallacanestro Varese players
Point guards
Basketball players from Vilnius
Trefl Sopot players